Anthony Farry is an Australian field hockey coach of the usa women's national team.

He coached the team at the 2018 Women's Hockey World Cup.

Previously Anthony was the head coach of the Canadian Men's field hockey team from 2012 to 2017. A highlight of which was guiding the team to Olympic qualification for the 2016 Rio Olympics.

References

Living people
Australian field hockey coaches
Australian expatriate sportspeople in Japan
Year of birth missing (living people)